Katonkaragay, also spelled Katon-Karagay is a district of East Kazakhstan Region in eastern Kazakhstan. The administrative center of the district is the selo of Ulken Narym  (Bolshenarymskoye). It is the easternmost district in Kazakhstan. Population:   

Near the selo of Berel excavations of ancient burial mounds have revealed artefacts the sophistication of which are encouraging a revaluation of the nomadic cultures of the 3rd and 4th centuries BC.

References

External links
Official Government Site of Katon-Karagay

Districts of Kazakhstan
East Kazakhstan Region